Yakov Krotov (born 1957) is a Russian essayist, historian, radio host and priest of the Orthodox Church of Ukraine.

In 1977–1989, he worked as a librarian and archivist. From 1990 he is a free-lanced author. He writes about history, Christianity, promotes values of tolerance, religious liberty and peace-making.

From 1997 he works for the Radio Free Europe, making weekly talk-shows under  the title "From the Christian point of view".

He has been lecturing in the United States on the Russian Orthodoxy as a Bradley Visiting Scholar in 1994.

He is married and has two sons.

His electronic library and blog
His electronic library (Russian)

Some of his publications of online
Sermon by priest Yakov Krotov, The moleben at the Cathedral of the Redeemer blessed and sanctified rocket forces of Russia. Well, it seems to be closer to heaven than sanctified BMWs of the new Russian rich, Novaya Gazeta, September 6, 2007
A country where sociopathy won
Army soul of Russia
Unity of the Church

References

Living people
Ukrainian priests
1957 births
Russian political activists
Moscow State University alumni
Radio Free Europe/Radio Liberty people
Russian activists against the 2022 Russian invasion of Ukraine